Master of Ceremonies or more properly Grand Master of the Ceremonies, in Sweden are three chief administrators charged with ceremonial matters relating to the Royal Court of Sweden.

History
Sweden has since 1802 a Grand Master of Ceremonies, a Master of Ceremonies and a Vice Master of Ceremonies within the Royal Court of Sweden. They are part of the Ceremonial Household (Ceremonielet), also called the Office of Ceremonies which in turn is a part of the Office of the Marshal of the Court (Hovmarskalksämbetet). They are responsible for ceremonial state visits, formal audiences, medal awards, official meals and receptions, as well as during royal christenings, birthdays, marriages, and burials. The Grand Master of Ceremonies is usually a former ambassador and has a special responsibility for contacts with the diplomatic corps in Stockholm.

The professional backgrounds of the Master of Ceremonies, Vice Master of Ceremonies, Cabinet Chamberlain's and Chamberlain's varies from culture, science, business and defense and other government service. Together they must have a significant personal attention which comes in handy in the care of guests.

Grand Master of Ceremonies

????–????: Johan Jacob Burensköld
1701–1712: Johan Gabriel Sparwenfeld
????–????: ?
1732–????: Gustaf Cronström
????–????: Jakob Silfverstedt
1748–????: Johan Bergenstierna
1748–????: Hakvin Stiernblad
1758–1767: Lennart Ribbing
????–????: ?
1778–1782: Carl Anders Plommenfelt
????–????: ?
1802–1826: Leonard von Hauswolff
1826–1828: Åke Gustaf Oxentierna (acting)
1828–1831: Martin von Wahrendorff
1831–1843: Carl Gustaf Eickstedt d'Albedyhll
1843–1854: Carl Jedvard Bonde
????–????: ?
1863–1883: Filip von Saltza
1883–1896: Carl Fredrik Palmstierna
1896–1900: Carl Carlson Bonde
????–????: ?
1902–1907: Fredrik von Rosen
1907–1918: Robert Sager
1919–1950: Eugène von Rosen
1951–1953: Louis Carl Gerard Etienne de Geer af Leufsta
1953–1970: Joen Lagerberg
1971–1977: Alexis Aminoff
1977–1983: Tore Tallroth
1983–1988: Axel Lewenhaupt
1988–1995: Carl Gustaf von Platen
1995–2000: Tom Tscherning
2000–2005: Christer Sylvén
2005–2011: Magnus Vahlquist
2011–2014: Lars Grundberg
2014–present: Johan Molander

References

External links
Swedish Ceremonial Household

Masters of ceremonies
Swedish titles
Swedish monarchy